Charles Johnston  (1 September 1903 – 1999) was a British athlete who competed at the 1924 Summer Olympics.

References

External links
 

1903 births
1999 deaths
Place of death missing
People from Thorntonhall
Athletes (track and field) at the 1924 Summer Olympics
Scottish male long-distance runners
Olympic athletes of Great Britain
Scottish Olympic competitors